The 1928 Connecticut Aggies football team represented Connecticut Agricultural College—now known as the University of Connecticut—in the 1928 college football season.  The Aggies were led by sixth-year head coach Sumner Dole and completed the season with a record of 4–1–3.

Schedule

References

Connecticut
UConn Huskies football seasons
Connecticut Aggies football